This is a list of characters from the Power Rangers universe – including Rangers, villains and supporting characters. Minor characters (including Monsters, foot soldiers, cross-over characters, and spin-off characters) may not be listed.

A
 Abraham (see Wild West Rangers)
 Adam Park
 Adelle Ferguson
 Admiral Malkor (see Villains in Power Rangers Megaforce)
 Aiden Romero / Levi Weston (see List of Power Rangers Ninja Steel characters)
 Aiden Romero Robot (see List of Power Rangers Ninja Steel characters)
 Aisha Campbell
 Albert Smith (see Power Rangers Dino Charge)
 Alex Drake (see Time Force Power Rangers)
 Alice Roberts (see List of Power Rangers Time Force characters)
 Alicia (Wild West Rangers)
 Ally Samuels (see Space Patrol Delta)
 Alpha 4
 Alpha 5
 Alpha 6
 Alpha 7
 Alyssa Enrilé (see Wild Force Power Rangers)
 Amelia Jones (see Power Rangers Dino Fury)
 Andrew Hartford (see Allies in Power Rangers Operation Overdrive)
 Andros (see Space Power Rangers)
 Angela
 Angela Fairweather
 Animus (see Zords in Power Rangers Wild Force)
 Anton Mercer
 Antonio Garcia (see Samurai Power Rangers)
 Anubis "Doggie" Cruger
 Appleby
 Archerina
 Argus (see Villains in Power Rangers Megaforce)
 Artilla (see Villains in Power Rangers: Wild Force)
 Ashley Hammond (see Turbo Power Rangers) 
 A-Squad Blue Ranger (see A-Squad S.P.D. Power Rangers)
 A-Squad Green Ranger(see A-Squad S.P.D. Power Rangers)
 A-Squad Pink Ranger (see A-Squad S.P.D. Power Rangers)
A-Squad Yellow Ranger (see A-Squad S.P.D. Power Rangers)
 Astronema (see Villains in Power Rangers: In Space)
 Auric the Conqueror
 Aurico (see Aquitian Rangers)
 Automon (see Machine Empire Remnants, Villains in Power Rangers: Wild Force)

B
 Baboo, (see Villains in Mighty Morphin Power Rangers)
 Badonna (see List of Power Rangers Ninja Steel characters)
Barbarax (see Villains in Power Rangers Lost Galaxy)
 Ben Burke (see List of Power Rangers Beast Morphers characters)
 Benglo (see Villains in Power Rangers Operation Overdrive)
 Benny (see Allies in Power Rangers: RPM)
 Betty Burke (see List of Power Rangers Beast Morphers characters)
 Bigs (see Villains in Power Rangers Megaforce)
 Billy Cranston
 Black Knight (see Villains in Power Rangers Time Force)
 Black Lance (see Villains in Power Rangers Mystic Force)
 Blake Bradley (see Ninja Storm Power Rangers)
 Blaze (see List of Power Rangers Beast Morphers characters)
 Blue Senturion 
 Bluefur (see Villains in Power Rangers Megaforce)
 Boom (Space Patrol Delta)
 Boomblaster (see List of Power Rangers Dino Fury characters)
 Boomtower (see Villains in Power Rangers Dino Fury)
 Bowen (see Nick Russell, Mystic Force Power Rangers)
 Brax (see List of Power Rangers Ninja Steel characters)
 Bridge Carson (see S.P.D. Power Rangers)
 Brody Romero (see Power Rangers Ninja Steel)
Broodwing (see Villains in Power Rangers: S.P.D.)
 Bulk (see Bulk and Skull)

C
 Calindor (see Imperious, Villains in Power Rangers Mystic Force)
 Calvin Maxwell (see Power Rangers Ninja Steel)
Cameron Watanabe (see Ninja Storm Power Rangers)
 Camille (see Villains in Power Rangers Jungle Fury)
 Caplan (see Minor characters of Power Rangers)
 Captain Logan (see Minor characters of Power Rangers)
 Captain Mitchell (see Minor characters of Power Rangers)
 Captain Mutiny (see Villains in Power Rangers Lost Galaxy)
 Carlos Vallerte (see Turbo Power Rangers)
 Carnisoar (see Villains in Power Rangers Jungle Fury)
 Carter Grayson (see Lightspeed Rescue Power Rangers)
 Casey Rhodes (see Jungle Fury Power Rangers)
 Cassidy Agnes Cornell (see Allies in Power Rangers: Dino Thunder)
 Cassie Chan (see Turbo Power Rangers)
 Cestria (see Minor characters of Power Rangers)
 Cestro (see Aquitian Rangers)
 Chad Lee (see Lightspeed Rescue Power Rangers)
 Charlie (see A-Squad Red Ranger, A-Squad S.P.D. Power Rangers)
 Chase Randall (see Power Rangers Dino Charge)
 Charlie "Chip" Thorn (see Mystic Force Power Rangers)
 Cheetar (see Villains in Power Rangers Operation Overdrive)
 Chloe Ashford (see Power Rangers Hyperforce)
Choobo (see Villains in Power Rangers Ninja Storm)
 Circuit (see Allies in Power Rangers Time Force)
 Clare the Gatekeeper (see Allies in Power Rangers Mystic Force)
 Cole Evans (see Wild Force Power Rangers)
 Colonel Mason Truman (see Allies in Power Rangers: RPM)
 Commander Anubis "Doggie" Cruger
 Commander Shaw (see List of Power Rangers Beast Morphers characters)
 Commander Stanton (see Allies in Power Rangers Lost Galaxy)
 Conner McKnight (see Dino Thunder Power Rangers)
 Corcus (see Aquitian Rangers)
 Corporal Hicks (see Allies in Power Rangers: RPM)
 Cosmo Royale (see List of Power Rangers Ninja Steel characters)
 Councilor Brody (see Allies in Power Rangers Lost Galaxy)
 Crazar (see Villains in Power Rangers Operation Overdrive)
 Creepox (see Villains in Power Rangers Megaforce)
 Cruise (see Beast Bots, List of Power Rangers Beast Morphers characters)
 Curio (see Villains in Power Rangers Dino Charge)
 Cyber Cam (see Minor characters of Power Rangers)
 Cybervillain Blaze (see Villains in Power Rangers Beast Morphers)
 Cybervillain Roxy (see Villains in Power Rangers Beast Morphers)

D
 D.E.C.A. (see Allies in Power Rangers: In Space and Allies in Power Rangers Lost Galaxy)
 Daggeron (see Mystic Force Power Rangers)
 Dai Shi (see Villains in Power Rangers Jungle Fury)
 Damaras (see Villains in Power Rangers Megaforce)
 Damon Henderson (see Galaxy Power Rangers)
 Dana Mitchell (see Lightspeed Rescue Power Rangers)
 Danny Delgado (see Wild Force Power Rangers)
 Dark Specter (see Villains in Power Rangers: In Space)
 Darkonda (see Villains in Power Rangers: In Space)
 David Truehart
 Dax Lo (see Operation Overdrive Power Rangers)
 Dayu (see Villains in Power Rangers Samurai)
 Deker (see Villains in Power Rangers Samurai)
 Delphine (see Aquitian Rangers)
Devin Del Valle (see Allies in Power Rangers: Dino Thunder)
 Deviot (see Villains in Power Rangers Lost Galaxy)
 Devon Daniels (see Power Rangers Beast Morphers)
 Diabolico (see Villains in Power Rangers Lightspeed Rescue)
 Dillon (see RPM Power Rangers)
 Dimitria (see Minor characters of Power Rangers)
 Divatox (see Villains in Power Rangers Turbo)
 Dominic Hargan (see Jungle Fury Power Rangers)
 Doomwing (see Villains in Power Rangers Dino Charge)
 Dr. K (see Allies in Power Rangers: RPM)
 Dr. Katherine "Kat" Manx (see Space Patrol Delta)
 Dr. Lani Akana (See Power Rangers Dino Fury )
 Dr. Michael Zaskin (see Allies in Power Rangers Time Force)
 Dr. Viktor Adler (see Master Org, Villains in Power Rangers Wild Force)
 Dulcea (see Minor characters of Power Rangers)
 Dustin Brooks (see Ninja Storm Power Rangers)

E
 Ecliptor (see Villains in Power Rangers: In Space)
 Edward "Eddie" Banks XXV (see Power Rangers Hyperforce) Edward Cormier (see Allies in Power Rangers: Dino Thunder)
 Elgar (see Villains in Power Rangers Turbo and Villains in Power Rangers: In Space)
 Elizabeth "Z" Delgado (see Z Delgado, S.P.D. Power Rangers)
 Elsa (see Villains in Power Rangers Dino Thunder)
 Emily (see Samurai Power Rangers)
 Emily Lester (see Power Rangers Zeo)
 Emma Goodall (see Megaforce Power Rangers)
 Emperor Gruumm (see Villains in Power Rangers: S.P.D.)
 Emperor Mavro (see Villains in Power Rangers Megaforce)
 Eric McKnight (see Minor characters of Power Rangers)
 Eric Myers
 Ernie (see Mighty Morphin Power Rangers, see Power Rangers Megaforce)
 Ethan James (see Dino Thunder Power Rangers)
 Eugene Skullovitch (see Skull, Bulk and Skull)
 Evox (see Venjix, List of Power Rangers Beast Morphers characters)

F
 Farkas Bulkmeier (see Bulk, Bulk and Skull)
 Finster (see Villains in Mighty Morphin Power Rangers)
 Flit (see Villains in Power Rangers Jungle Fury)
 Flurious (see Villains in Power Rangers Operation Overdrive)
 Flynn McAllistair (see RPM Power Rangers)
 Fowler Birdy (see Supreme Commander Fowler Birdy, Space Patrol Delta)
 Fran (see Allies in Power Rangers: Jungle Fury)
 Frax (see Villains in Power Rangers Time Force)
 Fred Kelman
 Fresno Bob (see The Cartels, Minor Villains in Power Rangers RPM)
 Fuchsia O'Hara (see Wild West Rangers, Minor characters of Power Rangers)
 Furio (see Villains in Power Rangers Lost Galaxy)
 Fury (see Villains in Power Rangers Dino Charge)

G
 Gakko (see The Five Fingers of Poison, List of Power Rangers Jungle Fury characters)
 Galvanax (see List of Power Rangers Ninja Steel characters)
 Game Master (Power Rangers Hyperforce)
 Gasket (see Prince Gasket, Machine Empire)
 Gekkor (see Villains in Power Rangers Mystic Force)
 Gem (see RPM Power Rangers)
 Gemma (see RPM Power Rangers)
 General Burke (see List of Power Rangers Beast Morphers characters)
 General Crunch (see Villains in Power Rangers RPM)
 General Havoc (see Villains in Power Rangers Turbo)
 General Shifter (see Villains in Power Rangers RPM)
 General Tynamon (see List of Power Rangers Ninja Steel characters)
 General Venjix (see Machine Empire Remnants, Villains in Power Rangers: Wild Force)
 Gerrok (see Machine Empire Remnants, Villains in Power Rangers: Wild Force)
 Gia Moran (see Megaforce Power Rangers)
 Gluto (see Villains in Power Rangers Time Force)
 Goldar
 Gosei (see Allies in Power Rangers Megaforce)
 Grace Sterling (see Power Rangers (Boom! Studios))

H
 Havoc (see General Havoc, Villains in Power Rangers Turbo)
 Hayley Foster (see Power Rangers Ninja Steel) Hayley Ziktor (see Allies in Power Rangers: Dino Thunder)
 Heckyl (see Villains in Power Rangers Dino Charge)
 Hekatoid (see Villains in Power Rangers Mystic Force)
 Helicos (see Villains in Power Rangers: Wild Force)
 Hexuba (see Villains in Power Rangers Lost Galaxy)
 High Councilor Renier (see Allies in Power Rangers Lost Galaxy)
 Horrid King (see Power Rangers (Boom! Studios))
 Hunter Bradley (see Ninja Storm Power Rangers)
 Hydro Hog (see Villains in Mighty Morphin Power Rangers)

I
 Imperious (see Villains in Power Rangers Mystic Force)
 Impus (see Impus/Prince Olympius, Villains in Power Rangers Lightspeed Rescue)
 Isabella "Izzy" Garcia (Power Rangers Dino Fury)
 Itassis (see Villains in Power Rangers Mystic Force) 
 Ivan Ooze (see Villains in Mighty Morphin Power Rangers)

J
 J-Borg (See Power Rangers Dino Fury )
 Jack Landors (see S.P.D. Power Rangers)
 Jack Thomas (see Power Rangers Hyperforce)Jake Holling (see Megaforce Power Rangers)
 James Navarro (see Power Rangers Dino Charge)
 Jamie Gilmore 
 Jane Fairview (See Power Rangers Dino Fury )
 Jarrod (see List of Power Rangers Jungle Fury characters)
 Jason Lee Scott
 Javier "Javi" Garcia (see Power Rangers Dino Fury)
 Jax (see Beast Bots, List of Power Rangers Beast Morphers characters)
 Jayden Shiba (see Samurai Power Rangers)
 Jayden's father (see Allies in Power Rangers Samurai)
 Jellica (see Villains in Power Rangers Jungle Fury)
 Jennifer "Jen" Scotts
 Jenji (see Allies in Power Rangers: Mystic Force)
 Jerome Stone (see Lieutenant Jerome Stone)
 Ji (see Mentor Ji, Allies in Power Rangers Samurai)
 Jindrax (see Villains in Power Rangers: Wild Force)
 Jinxer (see Villains in Power Rangers Lightspeed Rescue)
 Joel Rawlings (see Lightspeed Rescue Power Rangers)
 Joseph "Joe" Shih (see Power Rangers Hyperforce)Juggelo (see Villains in Power Rangers: Wild Force)
 Justin Stewart
Julie Carpenter “Power Rangers Coffee Blast” (see pink ranger)

K
 Kai Chen (see Galaxy Power Rangers)
 Kamdor (see Villains in Power Rangers Operation Overdrive)
 Kapri (see Villains in Power Rangers Ninja Storm)
 Karone
 Katherine Hillard
 Kat Manx
 Katie Walker (see Time Force Power Rangers)
 Keeper (see Power Rangers Dino Charge)
 Kegler (see Villains in Power Rangers Lost Galaxy)
 Kelly Halloway (see Minor characters of Power Rangers)
 Kelsey Winslow (see Lightspeed Rescue Power Rangers)
 Kendall (see Allies in Power Rangers Wild Force)
 Kendall Morgan (see Power Rangers Dino Charge)
 Kendrix Morgan (see Galaxy Power Rangers)
 Kevin (see Samurai Power Rangers)
 Kilobyte (see Villains in Power Rangers RPM)
 Kimberly Hart
 King Mondo (see Machine Empire)
 Kira Ford (see Dino Thunder Power Rangers)
 Kired (see Mut-Orgs, Villains in Power Rangers: Wild Force)
 Kite (see Animus, Zords in Power Rangers Wild Force)
 Kiya Watanabe (see Lothor)
 Klank (see Machine Empire)
 Koda (see Power Rangers Dino Charge)
 Koragg the Knight Wolf (see Villains in Power Rangers Mystic Force)
 Kyle (see Allies in Power Rangers Ninja Storm)

L
 Lauren Shiba (see Samurai Power Rangers)
 Leanbow (see Mystic Force Power Rangers)
 Leelee Pimvare (see Allies in Power Rangers: Mystic Force)
 Leo Corbett
 Lerigot (Turbo: A Power Rangers Movie)
 Levira (see Villains in Power Rangers Megaforce)
 Lieutenant Jerome Stone
 Lily Chilman (see Jungle Fury Power Rangers)
 Lokar (see Villains in Mighty Morphin Power Rangers)
 Loki (see Villains in Power Rangers Lightspeed Rescue)
 Lord Arcanon (see Villains in Power Rangers Dino Charge)
 Lord Drakkon (see Power Rangers (Boom! Studios))
 Lord Draven (see Villains in Power Rangers Ninja Steel)
 Lord Zedd
 Lothor
 Louie Kaboom (see Machine Empire)
 Lucas Kendall (see Time Force Power Rangers)

M
 Machina (see Queen Machina, Machine Empire)
Mack Hartford (see Operation Overdrive Power Rangers)
 Madame Odius (see List of Power Rangers Ninja Steel characters)
 Madison Rocca (see Mystic Force Power Rangers)
 Magma (see Villains in Power Rangers Mystic Force)
 Magna Defender
 Magnificence (see Omni, Villains in Power Rangers S.P.D.)
 Maligore (see Villains in Power Rangers Turbo)
 Malkor (see Admiral Malkor, Villains in Power Rangers Megaforce)
 Mama D. ('see Villains in Power Rangers Turbo)
 Mandilok (see Villains in Power Rangers: Wild Force)
 Marah (see Villains in Power Rangers: Ninja Storm)
 Marina (see List of Power Rangers Lightspeed Rescue characters)
 Marvin "Marv" Shih (see Power Rangers Hyperforce)
 Master (see Master Vile, Villains in Mighty Morphin Power Rangers, see Master Org, Villains in Power Rangers: Wild Force, see The Master, Villains in Power Rangers: Mystic Force, see The Pai Zhuq Masters, see Master Xandred, Villains in Power Rangers Samurai)
 Master Finn (see the Pai Zhuq Masters, Allies in Power Rangers: Jungle Fury)
 Master Guin (see the Pai Zhuq Masters, Allies in Power Rangers: Jungle Fury)
 Master Lope (see the Pai Zhuq Masters, Allies in Power Rangers: Jungle Fury)
 Master Mao (see the Pai Zhuq Masters, Allies in Power Rangers: Jungle Fury)
 Master Org (see Villains in Power Rangers: Wild Force)
 Master Phant (see the Pai Zhuq Masters, Allies in Power Rangers: Jungle Fury)
 Master Rilla (see the Pai Zhuq Masters, Allies in Power Rangers: Jungle Fury)
 Master Swoop (see the Pai Zhuq Masters, Allies in Power Rangers: Jungle Fury)
 Master Vile (see Villains in Mighty Morphin Power Rangers)
 Master Xandred (see Villains in Power Rangers Samurai)
 Matoombo (see Villains in Power Rangers Mystic Force)
 Max Cooper (see Wild Force Power Rangers)
 Maya (see Galaxy Power Rangers)
 Mayor Daniels (see List of Power Rangers Beast Morphers characters)
 Megahorn (see Villains in Power Rangers Mystic Force)
 Megan (see List of Power Rangers Beast Morphers characters)
 Mentor Ji (see Allies in Power Rangers Samurai)
 Merrick Baliton
 Mesogog (see Villains in Power Rangers Dino Thunder)
 Messenger (see Villains in Power Rangers Megaforce)
 Metal Alice (see Villains in Power Rangers Megaforce)
 Mia Watanabe (see Samurai Power Rangers)
 Mick Kanic (see List of Power Rangers Ninja Steel characters)
 Mig (see Villains in Power Rangers Operation Overdrive)
 Mike (see Samurai Power Rangers)
 Mike Corbett
 Miratrix (see Villains in Power Rangers Operation Overdrive)
 Miss Alicia (see Wild West Rangers, Minor characters of Power Rangers)
 Moltor (see Villains in Power Rangers Operation Overdrive)
 Mondo (see King Mondo, Machine Empire, or Mondo the Magician, Villains in Mighty Morphin Power Rangers)
 Monty (see List of Power Rangers Beast Morphers characters)
 Mora / Morgana (see Mora/Morgana, Villains in Power Rangers: S.P.D.)
 Mordant (see Villains in Mighty Morphin Power Rangers)
 Morphin Masters (See Power Rangers Dino Fury)
 Morticon (see Villains in Power Rangers Mystic Force)
 Motodrone (see Villains in Power Rangers Ninja Storm)
 Mr. Burley (see Allies in Power Rangers Megaforce)
 Mr. Caplan (see Minor characters of Power Rangers)
 Mr. Collins (see Allies in Power Rangers Time Force)
 Ms. Appleby (see Minor characters of Power Rangers)
 Muriel Reeves (see List of Power Rangers Beast Morphers characters)
 Mucus (see Villains in Power Rangers Dino Fury)
 Mutiny (see Captain Mutiny, Villains in Power Rangers Lost Galaxy) 
 Mystic Mother (see Allies in Power Rangers: Mystic Force)

N
 Nadira (see Villains in Power Rangers Time Force)
 Naja (see The Five Fingers of Poison, List of Power Rangers Jungle Fury characters)
 Nate Silva (see Power Rangers Beast Morphers)
Nayzor (see Villains in Power Rangers: Wild Force)
 Necrolai (see Villains in Power Rangers Mystic Force)
 Nick Russell (see Mystic Force Power Rangers)
 Niella (see Allies in Power Rangers: Mystic Force)
 Nikolai Chukarin (see Power Rangers (Boom! Studios)
 Ninjor
 Noah Carver (see Megaforce Power Rangers)
 Norg (see Villains in Power Rangers Operation Overdrive)
 Nova Ranger (see S.P.D. Power Rangers)
 Nulleye (see List of Power Rangers Dino Fury characters)

O
 Octomus (see The Master, Villains in Power Rangers Mystic Force)
 Octoroo (see Villains in Power Rangers Samurai)
 Oculous (see Villains in Power Rangers Mystic Force)
 Officer Tate 
 Olivia Cook (see Power Rangers (Boom! Studios)
 Ollie Akana (see Power Rangers Dino Fury)
 Olympius (see Impus/Prince Olympius, Villains in Power Rangers Lightspeed Rescue)
 Omni (see Villains in Power Rangers: S.P.D.)
 Onikage (see Villains in Power Rangers: Wild Force)
 Orbus (see Machine Empire)
 Orion (see Megaforce Power Rangers)
 Orisonth (see Power Rangers (Boom! Studios)
 Orria (see List of Power Rangers Dino Fury characters)

P
 Phantom Ranger
 Phenomenus (see Professor Phenomenus, Minor characters in Power Rangers)
 Philips (see Allies in Power Rangers Time Force)
 Phineas (see Allies in Power Rangers: Mystic Force)
 Piggy (see Space Patrol Delta)
 Poisandra (see Villains in Power Rangers Dino Charge)
 Porto (see Villains in Power Rangers Turbo)
 Preston Tien (see Power Rangers Ninja Steel)
Prince Gasket (see Machine Empire)
 Prince Olympius (see Impus/Prince Olympius, Villains in Power Rangers Lightspeed Rescue)
 Prince Phillip III (see Power Rangers Dino Charge )
 Prince Sprocket (see Machine Empire)
 Prince Vekar (see Villains in Power Rangers Megaforce)
 Princess Archerina (see Machine Empire)
 Princess Shayla 
 Princess Viera (see List of Power Rangers Ninja Steel characters)
 Principal Randall (see Elsa, Villains in Power Rangers Dino Thunder)
 Professor Cog (see Villains in Power Rangers Samurai)
 Professor Phenomenus (see Minor characters of Power Rangers)
 Psycho Black (see Psycho Rangers)
 Psycho Blue (see Psycho Rangers)
 Psycho Pink (see Psycho Rangers)
 Psycho Red (see Psycho Rangers)
 Psycho Yellow (see Psycho Rangers)

Q
 Quarganon (see Villains in Power Rangers Time Force)
 Queen Adriyel (see Power Rangers (Boom! Studios)
 Queen Bansheera (see Villains in Power Rangers Lightspeed Rescue)
 Queen Machina (see Machine Empire)

R
 Randall (see Elsa, Villains in Power Rangers Dino Thunder)
 Ransik (see Villains in Power Rangers Time Force)
 Rantipede (see The Five Fingers of Poison, List of Power Rangers Jungle Fury characters)
 Ravi Shaw (see Power Rangers Beast Morphers)
 Reaghoul (see Villains in Power Rangers Dino Fury)
 Redbot (see List of Power Rangers Ninja Steel characters)
 Redker (see The Imperial Guard, List of Power Rangers Megaforce characters) 
 Retinax (see Villains in Power Rangers: Wild Force)
 Riley Griffin (see Power Rangers Dino Charge)
 Ripcon (see List of Power Rangers Ninja Steel characters)
 Rita Repulsa
 Rito Revolto (see Villains in Mighty Morphin Power Rangers)
 Robert "R.J." James (see Jungle Fury Power Rangers)
 Robo Knight (see Megaforce Power Rangers)
 Robo-Blaze (see Villains in Power Rangers Beast Morphers)
 Robo-Roxy (see Villains in Power Rangers Beast Morphers)
 Rocko (see Wild West Rangers)
 Rocky DeSantos
 Rofang (see Mut-Orgs, Villains in Power Rangers: Wild Force)
 Ronny Robinson (see Operation Overdrive Power Rangers)
 Rose Ortiz (see Operation Overdrive Power Rangers)
 Ryan Mitchell (see Lightspeed Rescue Power Rangers)
 Rygog (see Villains in Power Rangers Turbo)
 Ryjack (see Villains in Power Rangers Beast Morphers)

S
 S.O.P.H.I.E. (see List of Power Rangers S.P.D. characters)
 Sam
 Sam Scott (see Power Rangers)
 Santaura (see List of Power Rangers Dino Fury characters)
 Sarah Thompson (see Power Rangers Ninja Steel)
Schuyler "Sky" Tate
 Scorch (see Villains in Power Rangers Jungle Fury)
 Scorpina (see Villains in Mighty Morphin Power Rangers)
 Scorpius (see Villains in Power Rangers Lost Galaxy)
 Scott Truman (see RPM Power Rangers)
 Scrozzle (see Villains in Power Rangers Beast Morphers)
 Sculpin (see Villains in Power Rangers Mystic Force)
 Sensei Kanoi Watanabe (see Allies in Power Rangers Ninja Storm)
 Sentinel Knight (see Allies in Power Rangers Operation Overdrive)
 Sergeant Silverback (see Space Patrol Delta)
 Serpentina (see Villains in Power Rangers Mystic Force)
 Serrator (see Villains in Power Rangers Samurai)
 Shane Clarke (see Ninja Storm Power Rangers)
 Shayla (see Princess Shayla, Minor characters in Power Rangers) 
 Shelby Watkins (See Power Rangers Dino Charge )
 Shimazu (see Villains in Power Rangers Ninja Storm)
 Singe (See Villains in Power Rangers Dino Charge)
 Sir Ivan of Zandar (See Power Rangers Dino Charge)
 Sizzurai (see List of Power Rangers Dino Fury characters)
 Skull (see Bulk and Skull)
 Sledge (See Villains in Power Rangers Dino Charge)
 Slyther (see List of Power Rangers Dino Fury characters)
 Smash (see Beast Bots, List of Power Rangers Beast Morphers characters)
 Snapper (see Villains in Power Rangers Jungle Fury)
 Snide (See Villains in Power Rangers Dino Charge)
 Snow Prince (see Allies in Power Rangers: Mystic Force)
 Solon (See Power Rangers Dino Fury)
 Spencer (see Allies in Power Rangers Operation Overdrive)
 Spike Skullovitch (see Allies in Power Rangers Samurai)
 Sprocket (see Prince Sprocket, Machine Empire)
 Squatt (see Villains in Mighty Morphin Power Rangers)
 Steel (see Power Rangers Beast Morphers)
 Steelon (see Machine Empire Remnants, Villains in Power Rangers: Wild Force)
 Stingerella (see The Five Fingers of Poison, List of Power Rangers Jungle Fury characters)
 Summer Landsdown (see RPM Power Rangers)
 Supreme Commander Fowler Birdy (see Space Patrol Delta)
 Sydney "Syd" Drew (see S.P.D. Power Rangers)

T
 T.J. Johnson (see Turbo Power Rangers)
 Takach (see Mut-Orgs, Villains in Power Rangers: Wild Force)
 Tally (see Allies in Power Rangers Ninja Storm)
 Tanya Sloan
 Tarrick (see Villains in Power Rangers Dino Fury)
 Taylor Earhardt (see Wild Force Power Rangers)
 Tenaya 7 (see Tenaya, Villains in Power Rangers RPM)
 Tenaya 15 (see Tenaya, Villains in Power Rangers RPM)
 Tensou (see Allies in Power Rangers Megaforce)
 Terrence "Smitty" Smith (see Zeltrax, Villains in Power Rangers Dino Thunder)
 Tezzla (see Machine Empire Remnants, Villains in Power Rangers: Wild Force)
 Theo Martin (see Jungle Fury Power Rangers)
 Thrax (see Villains in Power Rangers Operation Overdrive)
 Tideus (see Aquitian Rangers)
 Toady (see The Five Fingers of Poison, List of Power Rangers Jungle Fury characters)
 Toby Slambrook (see Allies in Power Rangers: Mystic Force)
 Tom Oliver (see Villains in Mighty Morphin Power Rangers)
 Tommy Oliver
 Tori Hanson (see Ninja Storm Power Rangers)
 Toxica (see Villains in Power Rangers: Wild Force)
 Trakeena (see Villains in Power Rangers Lost Galaxy)
 Treacheron (see Villains in Power Rangers Lost Galaxy)
 Trek / Psycho Green (see Power Rangers (Boom! Studios)
 Trent Fernandez (see Dino Thunder Power Rangers)
 Trey of Triforia
 Trini Kwan
 Trip (see Time Force Power Rangers)
 Triskull (see Villains in Power Rangers Lightspeed Rescue)
 Troy Burrows (see Megaforce Power Rangers)
 Tyler Navarro (see Power Rangers Dino Charge)
 Tyzonn (see Operation Overdrive Power Rangers)

U
 Udonna (see Mystic Force Power Rangers)

V

 Vargoyle (see List of Power Rangers Beast Morphers characters) 
 Vasquez (see Allies in Power Rangers: RPM)
 Vella (see Allies in Power Rangers: Operation Overdrive)
 Venjix (see General Venjix, Machine Empire Remnants, see Villains in Power Rangers RPM)
 Verto (see Power Rangers (Boom! Studios)
 Vesper Vasquez (see Power Rangers Hyperforce)
Vexacus (see Villains in Power Rangers Ninja Storm)
 Victor Vincent (see List of Power Rangers Ninja Steel characters) 
 Vida Rocca (see Mystic Force Power Rangers)
 Viktor Adler (see Master Org, Villains in Power Rangers: Wild Force)
 Villamax (see Villains in Power Rangers Lost Galaxy)
 Vrak (see Villains in Power Rangers Megaforce)
 Vypra (see Villains in Power Rangers Lightspeed Rescue)

W
 Waldo "Dustin" Brooks, (see Dustin Brooks, Ninja Storm Power Rangers) 
 Warden Garcia (See Power Rangers Dino Fury )
 Wesley "Wes" Collins (see Time Force Power Rangers)
 Whiger (Villains in Power Rangers Jungle Fury)
 White Dino Ranger Clone (see Villains in Power Rangers Dino Thunder)
 White Knight (see list of Power Rangers Time Force characters)
 White Stranger (see Wild West Rangers)
 Will Aston (see Operation Overdrive Power Rangers)
 William (see Wild West Rangers)
 Willie (see Allies in Power Rangers Wild Force)
 Wreckmate (see List of Power Rangers Dino Fury characters)
 Wrench (see Villains in Power Rangers Dino Charge)

X
 Xander Bly (see Mystic Force Power Rangers)
 Xandred (see Master Xandred, Villains in Power Rangers Samurai)

Z
Z Delgado (see Power Rangers S.P.D.)
Zack Taylor
Zayto (see Power Rangers Dino Fury)
Zeltrax (see Power Rangers Dino Thunder)
Zen-Aku (see Power Rangers Wild Force)
 Zenowing (see Power Rangers Dino Charge)
Zhane
Ziggy Grover (see Power Rangers RPM)
Zika (see Power Rangers: Lost Galaxy)
Zoey Reeves (see Power Rangers Beast Morphers)
Zordon
Zurgane (see Power Rangers Ninja Storm)

Characters